Carphomigma is a genus of moths belonging to the subfamily Tortricinae of the family Tortricidae. The genus was erected by Alexey Diakonoff in 1953.

Species
 Carphomigma leontodes Diakonoff, 1953

See also
 List of Tortricidae genera

References

 Diakonoff, A. (1953). Verhandelingen der Koninklijke Nederlandse Akademie van Wetenschappen. (2) 49 (3): 35.
 Brown, John W. (2005). World Catalogue of Insects. 5.

External links
 Tortricid.net

Archipini
Tortricidae genera
Taxa named by Alexey Diakonoff